Ogmograptis,  the scribbly gum moths, is a genus in the family Bucculatricidae and was first described by Edward Meyrick in 1935, as a monotypic genus (consisting of one species only). They are found in the Australian Capital Territory, New South Wales and Queensland. However, in 2007,  Cooke and Edwards argued that the patterning of the scribbles was different for each of the three eucalypts, Eucalyptus pauciflora, E. racemosa ssp. rossii, and E. delegatensis) and that it was likely that these differing patterns were caused by different species of scribbly gum moths.

Taxonomy
In 2012, Horak et al. published a new account of the genus, describing eleven new species of Ogmograptis, and distinguishing three groups, the scribula, maxdayi and triradiata groups.

The groupings of Ogmograptis given by Horak et al. are shown below:

One species, Ogmograptis notosema Meyrick 1922 (Cryphioxena), was unable to be assigned to a group as no holotype could be located.

In allocating these three groups to the genus Ogmograptis, Horak et al. (2012) note that it is the scribula group which produces the
bark scribbles, and that the larval biology of the maxdayi and triradiata groups is not known.

References

External links

 Australian Museum
 Australian Insects
 Ecos Magazine

Moths of Australia
Bucculatricidae
Moths described in 1935
Taxa named by Edward Meyrick